Park Hee-soon (born February 13, 1970) is a South Korean actor. He graduated with a Theater degree from Seoul Institute of the Arts, and was a member of the Mokwha Repertory Company from 1990 to 2001. He became active in film beginning 2002, and won several Best Supporting Actor awards for his portrayal of a tough cop in Seven Days (2007). He received further acting recognitions for his roles in the films The Scam (2009) and 1987: When the Day Comes (2017). Apart from his film career, Park starred in television series All About My Romance  (2013), The Missing (2015), Beautiful World (2019), and My Name (2021), the lattermost of which brought him international attention.

Career

Early Career in Theater 
Park was born February 13, 1970. He graduated with a Theater degree from Seoul Institute of the Arts,Park started his acting career when he joined the troupe the Mokwha Repertory Company in 1990. One day in 2001, Park visited Oh Tae-seok, the representative and director of the troupe, and said “I’ve been in Mokhwa for 12 years. I’ll take a look around the outside world.”

Chungmuro Early Career 
Park did minor roles in film in 1994, however only became active in film from 2001. Park decided to try out for a career in film for at least 3 years. It was difficult for Park, who was a rookie, to get a place in Chungmuro. Step by step Park built his career by appearing in minor roles in Three, Box X Files and So Cute.

In 2004, Park's acted as gang leader in film A Family. His acting as villain was praised. He earned nomination for Best New Actor in 3rd Korean Film Awards.

In February 2005, Park made a comeback to theater stage. He appeared as Dan in the Aligator Theatre Company Korean debut of the hit play Closer, by Patrick Marber, which was produced as a film in 2004. It was performed at The Seoul Art Center Towol Theater. 

Park costarred in Antarctic Journal. Park Hee-soon showed an impressive performance as a sober squad leader in the movie.

In the same year, Park got his first lead role in romantic comedy film Love Talk.

Established actor and venture to small screen 
In 2007 he established himself as an indispensable acting actor in the film in Seven Days. Park won several Best Supporting Actor awards for his portrayal of a tough cop in Seven Days (2007). Park received the Best Actor Award at the Blue Dragon Film Awards and the Korea Film Awards, making a strong impression on the public and film officials.

In the same year, He debut in small screen with KBS 2TV Drama City Reservoir. It was followed by his first miniseries Evasive Inquiry Agency.

In 2009, Park acted as Hwang Jong-gu, gangster-turned-financier, in Lee Ho-jae's film The Scam. The film was received well commercially. Park also garnered critical aclaim for his performance which earned Best Supporting Actor Awards from 17th Chunsa Film Art Awards.

In 2010, Park acted as Kim Won-kang, a former football player who moved to East Timor in drama film A Barefoot Dream. It is based on the true story of Kim Shin-hwan, a retired Korean footballer who goes to East Timor after his business fails and launches a youth football team, thus becoming the "Hiddink of Korea." Directed by Kim Tae-kyun, this film was a co-production between South Korea and Japan .

In 2011, Park acted in Park Hoon-jung's debut film The Showdown. It was set in the 11th year of Gwanghaegun's reign, when Manchus invade of Joseon. Park acted as Heon-myung, Joseon military commander. He was one of three Joseon soldiers who are cornered by the Manchu forces and must fight a bloody battle in the middle of Manchuria.

In 2013, Park back to television after six years with SBS miniseries All About My Romance. Park also costarred in a 2013 South Korean action spy film The Suspect starring Gong Yoo, and directed by Won Shin-yun. Park's role was Min Se-hoon, a South Korean NIS operative demoted to drill sergeant after a failed mission where Ji Dong-cheol (played by Gong Yoo), spared him.

In 2014, Park comeback onstage after nine years, for 20th anniversary performance of Mokhwa. He performed in play Baekma River in the Moonlight. It performed in Seoul Namsan Arts Drama Center from June 20th to July 6th.

Park costarred in 2017 Korean political thriller film 1987: When the Day Comes directed by Jang Joon-hwan and written by Kim Kyung-chan, alongside Kim Yoon-seok, Ha Jung-woo, Yoo Hae-jin, Kim Tae-ri, and Lee Hee-joon. He acted as  Lieutenant Jo Han-kyung and won Best Supporting Actor at 54th Baeksang Arts Awards. In the same year, Park reunited with director Park Hoon-jung in his 2017 crime-action thriller film V.I.P.. He acted as Ri Dae-bum, a North Korean police officer who secretly crosses the border into the South to track down Kim Kwang-il (played by Lee Jong-suk).

In 2018, Park acted in science fiction action horror film written and directed by Park Hoon-jung, The Witch: Part 1. The Subversion.

In 2021, Park joined My Name, Netflix original series directed by Kim Jin-min. He played Choi Mu-jin, the boss of Dongcheon who has described himself as a best friend and brother to Ji-woo's father. Mu-jin takes Ji-woo under his wing when she first joins his organization and teaches her how to fight. In the same year, Park acted alongside Lee Sun-kyun in Dr. Brain, the first Korean-language show produced for Apple TV+, created by Kim Jee-woon. The sci-fi thriller is based on the Korean webtoon of the same name by Hongjacga.

Park costarred in Kim Jin-woo's Netflix original series A Model Family as Gwang-cheol.

Personal lives 
In 2010, Park involved in charity project in Chad. It was to fulfill his promise to his best friend, late Park Yong-ha. The school, named after late Park Yong-ha, was founded on September 18th, finally fulfilling Park's wish of helping to shape a brighter future for the children of Chad. It was documented by "Hope TV", a special documentary revolving around this special school was broadcast October 22nd. 

In 2011, it was reported that Park and actress Park Ye-jin were in relationship. They met two years prior and got close due to friendship formed as artist under the same agency. In January 2016, it was reported that they registered their marriage in 2015. They had a small celebration with family and friends in 2016.

Filmography

Film

Television series

Music video appearances

Web series

Stage

Theater

Musical

Awards and nominations

References

External links

1970 births
Living people
South Korean male film actors
South Korean male stage actors
South Korean male television actors
Seoul Institute of the Arts alumni
20th-century South Korean male actors
21st-century South Korean male actors
Best Supporting Actor Paeksang Arts Award (film) winners